Christian Jakobsen (born 27 August 1971) is a Danish badminton player. Jakobsen competed in two events at the 1996 Summer Olympics.

References

External links
 

1971 births
Living people
Danish male badminton players
Olympic badminton players of Denmark
Badminton players at the 1996 Summer Olympics
Place of birth missing (living people)